Vosmoye Marta is a rural locality (a settlement) in Zaplavnenskoye Rural Settlement, Leninsky District, Volgograd Oblast, Russia. The population was 257 as of 2010. There are 8 streets.

Geography 
Vosmoye Marta is located on the left bank of the Akhtuba River, 24 km northwest of Leninsk (the district's administrative centre) by road. Zaplavnoye is the nearest rural locality.

References 

Rural localities in Leninsky District, Volgograd Oblast